Kundarki is a town in the Moradabad district of Uttar Pradesh, India. It is located on the Moradabad–Agra highway, 18 km from the city of Moradabad.

History 
The settlement of Kundarki (कुंदारकी) predates the Mughal Empire. Historical records show its existence as early as the 10th century. Much later, in 1363, the explorer Ibn Battuta stayed there briefly.

In 1575, Kundarki became the estate of Raja Munshi Hardat Rai Sekribal, a Kayastha emperor. In 1578, he built a castle (mahal) in Kundarki, which earned his family the name "Mahal Wale". His descendants—including Babu Dinesh Bal Bhatnagar (a social worker who received the President's Award in 1984).

In 1628, the Mughal emperor Shah Jahan named Abdul Razzaq Sahab as Kundarki's shahar qazi, an Islamic judge. One of his descendants, Saeyad Raza Ali, was knighted by the British government and made the agent-general of South Africa. In 1874, Mir Hadi Ali, the grandfather of Sir Saeyad Raza Ali, introduced a railway station in Kundarki.

Kundarki became a panchayat in 1858 and a "town area" in 1907. In 1960, it was made a community development block, and over the next 30 years, a water system (1962), power station (1976) and police station (1986) were built. In 1994, to reflect the town's development, the government of Uttar Pradesh declared it a nagar panchayat.

A prominent attraction in Kundarki is its miniature Taj Mahal, made by a social worker, Chidda Khansari.

Demographics 
Kundarki had a population of 29,951 as of the 2011 Indian census. Of those, 15,863 were male and 14,088 were female.

Political leadership 
Mohammad Saif Ilyas chairman of Kundarki.

Economy
There are no major businesses in Kundarki, but business and money flow in from nearby Moradabad. The town has one petrol pump (Kundarki Filling Station). Prachin Shiv Mandir, The Saadat Mosque & The Qazi Mosque is the main socio-cultural center.

Education

Colleges and universities
Meena Institute of Technology and management
 Ambition Coaching center
 Imamuddin Turki Memorial Institute of Higher Education
 N. Bhushan Institute of Technology
 Majeed Khan Memorial Public School
 IQRA Public School
 Kundarki Intermediate College
 J.L.M. Intermediate College
 Evergreen Intermediate College
 Government Girls Intermediate College
 Kisan Public Inter College
 Kisan Public Primary School 
 Hazrat Ali Memorial Education Society

Public and Montessori schools
 N. Bhushan Public School
 Jwali Ram Inter College Jaitpur Patti
 Al-Baru Academy
 I.L.M. School
 Sheesh Academy
 Dayanand Bal Vidya Mandir
 Adarsh Bal Vidyalya
 Madrasa Ahle Sunnat Abwabul Uloom
 Madrasa Islamia Latifia Gulshan e Islam
 Madrasa Islamia Basheerul Uloom
 Madrasa Islamia Maqsoodul Uloom
 Madrasa Islamia Ahle Sunnat Gulshane Mustafa
 Madrasa Talimul Quran Kundarki

Notable residents 
Kundarki is the hometown of several freedom fighters, including Babu Jiva Ram, Munshi Ratanlal and Sayeed Razi Ul Hasan. The Qawwali singer Shankar Shambhu was also from Kundarki. Nazar Haider (Parran Bhai) retired from the post of Senior Administrative Officer from Moradabad Court in 2007.
IPS Officer, Ms. Ilma Afroz, native of Kundarki Village of Moradabad District, Uttar Pradesh proved that ‘nothing is impossible’.

 
In an interview, Ms. Afroz spoke about her journey from Kundarki village to IPS officers’ portals. For her success, she gave credit to her mother.

She said that her father had died when she was 10 years old and her mother supported her during her studies despite the fact that many persons had raised objections.

After completing her studies from St. Stephen's College, University of Delhi, Ms. Ilma moved to University of Oxford for higher education. On completion of her higher studies at Oxford, she came back to her native place to serve the nation.

 
Later, she started preparing for Civil Service Examination.

In CSE 2017, she secured 217th rank and opted to join Indian Police Service (IPS).

During the interview, she highlighted the importance of being connected with the people of the country.

 
Talking about the preparation for Civil Service Examination, Ms. Ilma suggested aspirants of the examination to be aware about the current national and international events. sources siasatnews.com

References 

Cities and towns in Moradabad district